A wireless onion router is a router that uses Tor to connect securely to a network. The onion router allows the user to connect to the internet anonymously creating an anonymous connection. Tor works using an overlaid network which is free throughout the world, this overlay network is created by using numerous relay points created using volunteer which helps the user hide personal information behind layers of encrypted data like layers of an onion. Routers are being created using Raspberry Pi adding a wireless module or using its own inbuilt wireless module in the later versions.

This router provides encryption at the seventh layer (application layer) of the OSI model, which makes it transparent encryption, the user does not have to think about how the data will be sent or received. The encrypted data includes the destination and origin IP address of the data and the current relay point only knows the previous and the next hop of the encrypted packet. These relay points are selected in a random order and can only decrypt a single layer before forwarding it to the next hop where is the procedure is followed unless it is the destination point.

Applications
A wireless router which can use the onion router network can be used to keep the user safe from hackers or network sniffers. The data captured by them won't make any sense as it will only look like messed up text. These are small and handy which will give the user a freedom to carry this tool and connect to the network from anywhere. This setup does not require installation of Tor browser on the work station. Whistle blowers and NGO workers use this network to pass information or to talk to their family without disclosing any information. The applications of wireless onion router are common to a normal router, it provides access that allows it to be placed at a site and users can get connected.

Tor can be used in security focused Operating Systems, messengers, browsers. These can be anonymised using Tor network.

Weaknesses
A wireless onion router works on the Tor network and shares the same weaknesses, as mentioned in the Tor page. The University of Michigan has created a scanner capable of scanning almost 90% of bridges that are live in a single scan. The packets that transferred using Tor also are slow because of the increased amount of hops with encryption and decryption.

Anonymous System (Eavesdropping) 
Anonymous systems if exists on both ends of the network, exit relay and entry relay can sniff the packets and statistically correlate the traffic which can point out the destination or the source address of the packet. This also includes eavesdropping at the exit nodes of the network. The data that is between the exit node and the destination server is not encrypted. These data packets can be captured easily. This captured data can reveal the source information, and as suggested by Egersta these nodes are costly to run and require a lot of bandwidth which could suggest that some intelligence agencies might be running them. There have been tested techniques with one third of control nodes to compromise the Tor network.

Traffic Analysis 
Articles have been proposed which with some partial knowledge of the network give away which nodes are being used to relay the packets which reduces the anonymity provided by the network. Another techniques which shows relations between streams and then can be linked back to the initiator are available, this technique however does not reveal the source.

IP Exposing Protocols 
Some protocols can be used to expose the IP address using tor dissimulation procedures. Some of the examples are Inspection of control messages of BitTorrent, Hijacking responses of the trackers, exploitation of distributed hash tables.

References

External links
Dark Web Markets

Computer networking
Hardware routers
Routers (computing)
Tor (anonymity network)